John Pearce (born January 13, 1947) is a former American football coach. He served as the head football coach at Stephen F. Austin State University in Nacogdoches, Texas from 1992 to 1998, compiling  a record of 46–32–2. After leaving his position at Stephen F. Austin, he was an assistant coach at the University of California, Los Angeles (UCLA) and Rice University.

Head coaching record

College

References

1947 births
Living people
Rice Owls football coaches
Stephen F. Austin Lumberjacks football coaches
Texas A&M Aggies football coaches
UCLA Bruins football coaches
Texas A&M University–Commerce alumni
High school football coaches in Texas
People from Sulphur Springs, Texas